José Luis Lasplazas Pujolar (18 June 1897 – 20 August 1975) was a Spanish rower, footballer and football manager. He competed in the men's eight event at the 1924 Summer Olympics.

References

External links
 

1897 births
1975 deaths
Spanish male rowers
Olympic rowers of Spain
Rowers at the 1924 Summer Olympics
People from Alt Empordà
Sportspeople from the Province of Girona
Spanish footballers
Footballers from Catalonia
Association football goalkeepers
Spanish football managers
Spain national football team managers
Spain national under-21 football team managers